JIS College of Engineering is a college located in Kalyani, West Bengal, India. The college was established in 2000.The Institution is declared Autonomous by the University Grants Commission (UGC) in 2011. In 2022, the college was accredited by NAAC with Grade-A. It is affiliated to Maulana Abul Kalam Azad University of Technology, West Bengal (MAKAUT,WB). The institute is ranked by NIRF in the range of 201–250 in 2021. In Atal Ranking of Institutions on Innovation Achievements (ARIIA) 2020, the institute has secured a place in Band B (Rank Between 26 th – 50 th ) among Private or Self-Financed College/Institutes in India.  On 1 September 2020, the institute celebrated its 20th Birthday.

Programs

Engineering 

 B. Tech Agricultural Engineering
 B. Tech Biomedical Engineering
 B. Tech Civil Engineering
 B. Tech Computer Science and Engineering
 B. Tech Computer Science and Technology
 B. Tech Electrical Engineering
 B. Tech Electronics and Communication Engineering
 B. Tech Information Technology
 B. Tech Mechanical Engineering
 M. Tech Computer Science and Engineering
 M. Tech Electrical Devices & Power System
 M. Tech Mechanical Engineering
 M. Tech Mobile Communication and Networking Technology
 Diploma in Electrical Engineering
 Diploma in Mechanical Engineering

Management 

 MBA
 BBA
 BBA in Digital Marketing
 BBA in Hospital Management
 B.Sc. in Hospitality and Hotel Administration

Computer Application 

 MCA
 BCA

See also

References

External links
 
 Makaut, WB affiliated colleges

Engineering colleges in West Bengal
Universities and colleges in Nadia district
Colleges affiliated to West Bengal University of Technology
Kalyani, West Bengal
Educational institutions established in 2000
2000 establishments in West Bengal